The 2013–14 Western Michigan Broncos men's basketball team represented Western Michigan University (WMU) during the 2013–14 NCAA Division I men's basketball season. The Broncos were Mid-American Conference (MAC) overall and West Division co-champions with Toledo, received the No. 1 seed in the conference tournament and defeated Toledo in the conference finals to receive the MAC's automatic berth into the 2014 NCAA Division I men's basketball tournament. WMU is led by 11th year head coach Steve Hawkins and play their home games at University Arena in Kalamazoo, Michigan.

WMU was given a 14 seed in the NCAA Tournament and lost to No. 3 seeded Syracuse in the second round 77–53. Syracuse was ranked No. 14 in the AP Poll.

Seniors David Brown and Shayne Whittington were awarded All-MAC first team honors while Hawkins was awarded the MAC Coach of the Year.

2013 recruiting class
Western Michigan brought in three freshmen from high school detailed in the following table.

Preseason

WMU was picked by a 25-member MAC news media panel to finish second in the MAC West Division. They finished with 108 points, 41 points behind first place Toledo and 7 points ahead of third place Eastern Michigan. Senior forward Shayne Whittington was selected to the West Division All-MAC Team.  The Broncos did not receive any first place votes to win the division nor any votes to win the conference tournament.

Western Michigan defeated Kalamazoo College 88–59 and Aquinas College 69–54 in exhibition games at University Arena prior to opening the regular season against New Mexico State in the Rainbow Classic.

Season

Rainbow Classic
Western Michigan opened the 2013–14 season in Hawaii by winning the Rainbow Classic. WMU finished 2–1 in the four-team, round-robin tournament along with New Mexico State and Hawaii and was awarded the title based on the tiebreaker of fewest points allowed in the tournament. The Broncos gave up 194 total points while New Mexico State and Hawaii allowed 213 and 218 points, respectively.

Senior guard David Brown was named to the All-Tournament Team.

Awards
The Broncos received six MAC West Division Player of the Week awards this season.

David Brown
Senior guard David Brown was named the MAC West Division Player of the Week on February 10, 2014. In two wins over Ohio and Northern Illinois, Brown averaged 23 points per game. Brown shot 14–23 (61%) for field goals and 10–14 (71%) on three-point field goals. He also had eight rebounds and five steals during the week. In the NIU game, Brown had 20 points in the first half while making his first nine shots of the game.

Connar Tava
Sophomore forward Connar Tava was named the MAC West Division Player of the Week on December 2, 2013. Tava averaged 18 points, 10 rebounds, 3 assists and 2 steals in a 99–88 win over Oakland and an 83–70 win over Cornell. Tava made all eight field goal attempts against Oakland and recorded his first career double–double against Cornell.

Tava won his second MAC West Division Player of the Week on January 13, 2014. In two victories over preseason favorite Toledo and Miami, Tava averaged 23.5 points per game and made 16 of 17 field goals (94.1%). The only field goal he missed was his final shot of the game against Miami. Tava also recorded nine rebounds, six assists, two blocked shots and two steals during the two games.

Shayne Whittington
Senior center Shayne Whittington was named the MAC West Division Player of the Week on January 27, 2014. Whittington averaged 19.5 points, 10.5 rebounds and 1.5 blocked shots per game in two wins against Kent State and Ball State.

Whittington was named the co-MAC West Division Player of the Week on February 17, 2014. Whittington averaged 16.5 points and 8.5 rebounds per game in two wins over Akron and Miami that moved WMU into a tie for first place in the MAC. He also recorded four blocks against Miami.

He earned his second consecutive MAC West Player of the Week on February 24, 2014. In wins over Ohio and Eastern Michigan, Whittington averaged 16.5 points and 11.0 rebounds per game. He did that while missing two practices prior to the EMU game.

Roster

Schedule

|-
!colspan=9| MAC tournament

|-
!colspan=9| NCAA tournament

References

Western Michigan Broncos men's basketball seasons
Western Michigan
Western Michigan